Sin Fronteras (Without Borders) is the title of the second studio album released by Panamanian singer-songwriter Makano on October 19, 2010.

Track listing

 Su Nombre En Mi Cuaderno (feat. Josenid)
 Como Hago Para Olvidarte
 No Me Dejes Solo
 No Hay Nadie Como Yo
 Se Acabó Tú Juego
 Déjame Volver
 Yo Te Extrañé (feat. Monty)
 Confidente
 Dime
 Te Amaré
 Somos Amantes
 No Me Vuelvo a Enamorar

2010 albums
Makano albums
Machete Music albums
Spanish-language albums